The twenty-third World Masters Athletics Championships were held in Málaga, Spain, from September 4–September 16, 2018. This was the second even year of the biennial championship as beginning in 2016 in Perth, Australia, the championships moved to be held in even numbered years. The World Masters Athletics Championships serve the division of the sport of athletics for people over 35 years of age, referred to as Masters athletics.

A full range of track and field events were held, along with a cross country race and a marathon.

Track results
100 metres

All finals held on September 6, 2018

W35 100 metres

Wind: +0.1

W40 100 metres

Wind: +0.0

W45 100 metres

Wind: +0.7

W50 100 metres

Wind: -0.6

W55 100 metres

Wind: +0.6

W60 100 metres

Wind: -2.7

W65 100 metres

Wind: -1.5

W70 100 metres

Wind: -3.6

W75 100 metres

Wind: -2.3

W80 100 metres

Wind: -1.9

W85 100 metres

Wind: -2.8

W90 100 meters

Wind: -3.1

W100 100 meters

Wind: -3.1

200 metres
All finals held on September 9, 2018

W35 200 metres
Wind: -1.3

W40 200 metres
Wind: -1.7

W45 200 metres
Wind: -0.3

W50 200 metres
Wind: -0.3

W55 200 metres
Wind: +0.9

W60 200 metres
Wind: +1.0

W65 200 metres
Wind: +4.1

W70 200 metres
Wind: -1.3

W75 200 metres
Wind: -0.7

W80 200 metres
Wind: -2.1

W85 200 metres
Wind: -1.8

W100 200 metres
Wind: -1.8

400 metres
All finals held on September 14, 2018

W35 400 metres

W40 400 metres

W45 400 metres

W50 400 metres

W55 400 metres

W60 400 metres

W65 400 metres

W70 400 metres

W75 400 metres

W80 400 metres

W85 400 metres

800 metres
All finals held September 11, 2018

W35 800 metres

W40 800 metres

W45 800 metres

W50 800 metres

W55 800 metres

W60 800 metres

W65 800 metres

W70 800 metres

W75 800 metres

W80 800 metres

W85 800 metres

1500 metres
All finals held September 16, 2018

W35 1500 metres

W40 1500 metres

W45 1500 metres

W50 1500 metres

W55 1500 metres

W60 1500 metres

W65 1500 metres

W70 1500 metres

W75 1500 metres

W80 1500 metres

W85 1500 metres

5000 metres
Held September 12, 2018, most divisions as two timed finals

W35 5000 metres
30 athletes, 2 timed heats.  All medalists ran in heat 2

W40 5000 metres
27 athletes, 2 timed heats.  All medalists ran in heat 2

W45 5000 metres
29 athletes, 2 timed heats.  All medalists ran in heat 2

W50 5000 metres
34 athletes, 2 timed heats.  All medalists ran in heat 2

W55 5000 metres
28 athletes, 2 timed heats.  All medalists ran in heat 2

W60 5000 metres
29 athletes, 2 timed heats.  All medalists ran in heat 2

W65 5000 metres

W70 5000 metres

W75 5000 metres

W80 5000 metres

Short hurdles
All finals held September 15, 2018

W40 80 metres hurdles
Wind: +1.3

W45 80 metres hurdles
Wind: +1.2

W50 80 metres hurdles
Wind: -0.3

W55 80 metres hurdles
Wind: +0.1

W60 80 metres hurdles
Wind: -1.2

W65 80 metres hurdles
Wind: -1.2

W70 80 metres hurdles
Wind: +0.1

W75 80 metres hurdles
Wind: -0.7

W80 80 metres hurdles
Wind: -0.7

W35 100 metres hurdles
Wind: -1.5

Long hurdles
All finals held September 7, 2018

W70 200 metres hurdles
Wind: -0.3

W75 200 metres hurdles
Wind: -0.4

W50 300 metres hurdles

W55 300 metres hurdles

W60 300 metres hurdles

W65 300 metres hurdles

W35 400 metres hurdles

W40 400 metres hurdles

W45 400 metres hurdles

Steeplechase
Held September 7, 2018

W35 2000 metres steeplechase

W40 2000 metres steeplechase

W45 2000 metres steeplechase

W50 2000 metres steeplechase

W55 2000 metres steeplechase

W60 2000 metres steeplechase

W65 2000 metres steeplechase

W70 2000 metres steeplechase

W75 2000 metres steeplechase

4x100 metres relay
All relays September 16, 2018

W35 4x100 metres relay
7 teams

W40 4x100 metres relay
10 teams, 1 heat on a 9 lane track

W45 4x100 metres relay
10 teams, 2 heats as timed finals

W50 4x100 metres relay
11 teams, 2 heats as timed finals

W55 4x100 metres relay
10 teams, 2 heats as timed finals

W60 4x100 metres relay
10 teams, 2 heats as timed finals

W65 4x100 metres relay

W70 4x100 metres relay

W75 4x100 metres relay

W80 4x100 metres relay

4x400 metres relay
All relays September 16, 2018

W35 4x400 metres relay
9 teams

W40 4x400 metres relay
13 teams, 2 heats timed final

Note,  4:11.47 in heat 2

W45 4x400 metres relay
8 teams

W50 4x400 metres relay
8 teams

W55 4x400 metres relay
9 teams

W60 4x400 metres relay
9 teams

W65 4x400 metres relay

W70 4x400 metres relay

W80 4x400 metres relay

Field results
High Jump
Held September 10, 2018

W35 High Jump

W40 High Jump

W45 High Jump

W50 High Jump

W55 High Jump

W60 High Jump

W65 High Jump

W70 High Jump

W75 High Jump

W80 High Jump

Pole Vault

W35 Pole Vault
September 12, 2018

W40 Pole Vault
September 12, 2018

W45 Pole Vault
September 12, 2018

W50 Pole Vault
September 12, 2018

W55 Pole Vault
September 9, 2018

W60 Pole Vault
September 9, 2018

W65 Pole Vault
September 12, 2018

W70 Pole Vault
September 12, 2018

W75 Pole Vault
September 12, 2018

Long Jump

W35 Long Jump
September 9, 2018

W40 Long Jump
24 athletes.  Two flights and final on September 9, 2018

W45 Long Jump
23 athletes.  One flight and final on September 11, 2018

W50 Long Jump
33 athletes.  Two flights and final on September 11, 2018

W55 Long Jump
28 athletes.  Two flights and final on September 11, 2018

Upshaw wins on tiebreaker, 2nd best jump 4.54 to Viebahn 4.49

W60 Long Jump
23 athletes.  Two flights and final on September 11, 2018

W65 Long Jump
September 11, 2018

W70 Long Jump
September 11, 2018

W75 Long Jump
September 11, 2018

W80 Long Jump
September 11, 2018

Vitola took 3rd on tiebreaker, Shiu-Yu Lin Pan  also jumped 2.83, 2nd best jump 2.78 to 2.69

W85 Long Jump
September 11, 2018

W90 Long Jump
September 11, 2018

Triple Jump
Held September 12, 2018

W35 Triple Jump

W40 Triple Jump

W45 Triple Jump

W50 Triple Jump

W55 Triple Jump

W60 Triple Jump

W65 Triple Jump

W70 Triple Jump

W75 Triple Jump

W80 Triple Jump

W85 Triple Jump

W90 Triple Jump

Shot Put

W35 Shot Put
September 5, 2018

W40 Shot Put
September 5, 2018

W45 Shot Put
28 athletes, 2 flights and final held on September 5, 2018

W50 Shot Put
28 athletes, 2 flights and final held on September 5, 2018

W55 Shot Put
31 athletes, 2 flights and final held on September 5, 2018

W60 Shot Put
28 athletes, 2 flights and final held on September 5, 2018

IAAF rule 187-4d was noted in the results for Geremias.  No indication she was disqualified for an offense.  Rule 187-4d involves spreading a substance on hand or ring to gain an advantage

W65 Shot Put
September 5, 2018

W70 Shot Put
September 5, 2018

W75 Shot Put
September 4, 2018

W80 Shot Put
September 4, 2018

W85 Shot Put
September 4, 2018

W90 Shot Put
September 4, 2018

W95 Shot Put
September 4, 2018

Discus Throw

W35 Discus Throw
September 10, 2018

W40 Discus Throw
September 10, 2018

W45 Discus Throw
23 athletes, 2 flights and final held on September 10, 2018

W50 Discus Throw
34 athletes, 2 flights and final held on September 10, 2018

W55 Discus Throw
34 athletes, 2 flights and final held on September 10, 2018

W60 Discus Throw
35 athletes, 2 flights and final held on September 10, 2018

W65 Discus Throw
26 athletes, 2 flights and final held on September 9, 2018

W70 Discus Throw
23 athletes, 2 flights and final held on September 9, 2018

W75 Discus Throw
25 athletes, 2 flights and final held on September 9, 2018

W80 Discus Throw
September 9, 2018

W85 Discus Throw
September 9, 2018

W90 Discus Throw
September 9, 2018

W95 Discus Throw
September 9, 2018

Hammer Throw

W35 Hammer Throw
September 6, 2018

W40 Hammer Throw
September 6, 2018

W45 Hammer Throw
22 athletes, 1 flight and final held on September 6, 2018

W50 Hammer Throw
20 athletes, 1 flight and final held on September 4, 2018

W55 Hammer Throw
30 athletes, 2 flights and final held on September 6, 2018

W60 Hammer Throw
23 athletes, 1 flight and final held on September 6, 2018

W65 Hammer Throw
27 athletes, 2 flights and final held on September 6, 2018

W70 Hammer Throw
September 6, 2018

W75 Hammer Throw
20 athletes, 1 flight and final held on September 5, 2018

W80 Hammer Throw
September 5, 2018

W85 Hammer Throw
September 5, 2018

W90 Hammer Throw
September 5, 2018

Javelin Throw

W35 Javelin Throw
15 athletes, 1 flight and final held on September 11, 2018

W40 Javelin Throw
15 athletes, 1 flight and final held on September 11, 2018

W45 Javelin Throw
17 athletes, 1 flight and final held on September 11, 2018

W50 Javelin Throw
28 athletes, 2 flights and final held on September 11, 2018

W55 Javelin Throw
31 athletes, 2 flights and final held on September 11, 2018

W60 Javelin Throw
25 athletes, 2 flights and final held on September 11, 2018

W65 Javelin Throw
28 athletes, 2 flights and final held on September 10, 2018

W70 Javelin Throw
19 athletes, 1 flight and final held on September 10, 2018

W75 Javelin Throw
21 athletes, 1 flight and final held on September 10, 2018

W80 Javelin Throw
September 10, 2018

W85 Javelin Throw
September 10, 2018

W95 Javelin Throw
September 10, 2018

W100 Javelin Throw
September 10, 2018

Weight Throw

W35 Weight Throw
September 11, 2018

W40 Weight Throw
September 11, 2018

W45 Weight Throw
17 athletes, 1 flight held on September 11, 2018

W50 Weight Throw
17 athletes, 1 flight held on September 11, 2018

W55 Weight Throw
28 athletes, 2 flights and final held on September 11, 2018

W60 Weight Throw
23 athletes, 2 flights and final held on September 11, 2018

W65 Weight Throw
21 athletes, 1 flight, held on September 11, 2018

W70 Weight Throw
14 athletes, 1 flight, held on September 11, 2018

W75 Weight Throw
15 athletes, 1 flight, held on September 11, 2018

W80 Weight Throw
September 11, 2018

W90 Weight Throw
September 11, 2018

Throws Pentathlon

W35 Throws Pentathlon
September 15, 2018

W40 Throws Pentathlon
13 athletes, September 15, 2018

W45 Throws Pentathlon
17 athletes, September 15, 2018

W50 Throws Pentathlon
24 athletes, September 16, 2018

W55 Throws Pentathlon
29 athletes, September 16, 2018

W60 Throws Pentathlon
20 athletes, September 16, 2018

W65 Throws Pentathlon
16 athletes, September 16, 2018

W70 Throws Pentathlon
13 athletes, September 12, 2018

W75 Throws Pentathlon
14 athletes, September 12, 2018

W80 Throws Pentathlon
September 12, 2018

W90 Throws Pentathlon
September 12, 2018

Heptathlon

W35 Heptathlon
8 athletes, September 5–6, 2018

W40 Heptathlon
10 athletes, September 5–6, 2018

W45 Heptathlon
16 athletes, September 5–6, 2018

W50 Heptathlon
23 athletes, September 5–6, 2018

W55 Heptathlon
16 athletes, September 5–6, 2018

W60 Heptathlon
9 athletes, September 5–6, 2018

W65 Heptathlon
10 athletes, September 5–6, 2018

W70 Heptathlon
10 athletes, September 5–6, 2018

W75 Heptathlon
September 5–6, 2018

W80 Heptathlon
September 5–6, 2018

See also
2018 World Masters Athletics Championships Men

References

World Masters Athletics Championships
International athletics competitions hosted by Spain
World Masters Athletics Championships
World Masters Athletics Championships